The Pyoza is a river in Mezensky District of Arkhangelsk Oblast in Russia. It is a right tributary of the Mezen. The main tributaries of the Pyoza are the Tsema (left), Varchushka (right), the Chetsa (left), and the Loftura (right).

The river basin of the Pyoza includes the eastern part of Mezensky District, as well as some areas in Leshukonsky District, Nenets Autonomous Okrug, and Ust-Tsilemsky District of the Komi Republic. It is sparsely populated and includes a big number of lakes, the largest of which are Lake Varsh, Lake Pocha, and Lake Vyzhletskoye.

The source of the Pyoza is located on the east of Mezensky District. The Pyoza originates from the confluence of the Rochuga and the Bludnaya and flows west. The mouth of the Pyoza is almost opposite to the mouth of the Kimzha, a left tributary of the Mezen.

The valley of the Pyoza is populated, with the biggest settlements being the villages of Safonovo, Moseyevo, and Bychye. Bychye is located by a road with the selo of Dorogorskoye, and further with Mezen, Leshukonskoye, and Arkhangelsk. In Moseyevo and Safonovo, the air connections are the only means of transportation.

References

External links

Rivers of Arkhangelsk Oblast